Zelovo is a village in Croatia in the municipality of Muć. It was known as Zelovo Sutinsko until 1991.

Population
According to the 2011 census, Zelovo had 10 inhabitants.

Notable people
 Goalkeeper Vladimir Beara was born in the village.

References

Populated places in Split-Dalmatia County